Tímea Babos and Chan Hao-ching were the defending champions, but Chan chose not to participate this year. Babos chose to play in Monterrey, but lost in the first round.

Liang Chen and Wang Yafan won the title over third seeded Yuliya Beygelzimer and Olga Savchuk with the score, 4–6, 6–3, [10–4].

Seeds

Draw

Draw

References
Main draw

Malaysian Open
Malaysian Open (tennis)